Simon Trummer (born  8 June 1989 in Frutigen, Canton of Bern) is a racing driver from Switzerland.

Career

Karting
Trummer began his motorsport career in karting back in 2003, finishing second in the Swiss Junior Championship. He also finished 21st in the Andrea Margutti Trophy ICA Junior class.

Formula Lista Junior
Trummer moved up to single-seaters in 2006, competing in Formula Lista Junior. He finished eighteenth overall in the championship with ten points.

Formula Renault
Trummer joined the BMS Böhlen Motorsport team in 2007, to compete in the Formule Renault 2.0 Suisse championship. He wasn't so successful in this series, winding up seventh in the championship. Trummer switched teams, joining Jenzer Motorsport for 2008 and finished the season as runner-up.

International Formula Master
After two races at the end of the 2008 season, Trummer moved up to the International Formula Master series for the 2009 season, with Iris Project. He finished in eleventh place in the standings.

GP3 Series
Trummer stepped up to the new GP3 Series with Jenzer Motorsport in 2010. He finished the season in 25th place with four points, despite missing the round in Hungary due to driving into the rear of another car in Hockenheim.  During 2010 in GP3 with Jenzer Motorsport he was always outperformed by fellow Swiss driver Nico Müller which lead Simon to seak another team for 2011. He moved to MW Arden for the 2011 campaign. Trummer had three point-scoring finishes in final races, improving to 18th position with nine points.

GP2 Series

After competing in the non-championship season finale at Yas Marina in 2011, Trummer continued his collaboration with Arden International into 2012 by switching to the GP2 Series full-time. He joined series veteran Luiz Razia in the team, and finished 23rd in the final standings. He then went to Rapax in the 2013 GP2 Series season, and is confirmed with Rapax for the 2014 season.

Racing record

Career summary

† As Trummer was a guest driver, he was ineligible for championship points.
* Season still in progress.

Complete GP3 Series results
(key) (Races in bold indicate pole position) (Races in italics indicate fastest lap)

Complete GP2 Series results
(key) (Races in bold indicate pole position) (Races in italics indicate fastest lap)

Complete GP2 Final results
(key) (Races in bold indicate pole position) (Races in italics indicate fastest lap)

Complete FIA World Endurance Championship results

Complete 24 Hours of Le Mans results

Complete WeatherTech SportsCar Championship results

Complete European Le Mans Series results
(key) (Races in bold indicate pole position; results in italics indicate fastest lap)

Complete Asian Le Mans Series results 
(key) (Races in bold indicate pole position) (Races in italics indicate fastest lap)

References

External links
 
 

1989 births
Living people
People from Frutigen-Niedersimmental District
Swiss racing drivers
Formula Renault 2.0 Alps drivers
Italian Formula Renault 2.0 drivers
International Formula Master drivers
Swiss GP3 Series drivers
GP2 Series drivers
24 Hours of Le Mans drivers
FIA World Endurance Championship drivers
Porsche Supercup drivers
24 Hours of Daytona drivers
Jenzer Motorsport drivers
Arden International drivers
Rapax Team drivers
Manor Motorsport drivers
Sportspeople from the canton of Bern
Formula Lista Junior drivers
WeatherTech SportsCar Championship drivers
Asian Le Mans Series drivers
Kolles Racing drivers
Hilmer Motorsport drivers
JDC Motorsports drivers
Phoenix Racing drivers
Nürburgring 24 Hours drivers